Giuseppe Bonno (29 January 1711 – 15 April 1788) was an Austrian composer of Italian origin. (His name is sometimes given as Josef or Josephus Johannes Baptizta Bon.)

The son of a footman from Brescia who served at the Austrian court, he was born in Vienna and studied music with Johann Georg Reinhardt, imperial court organist, later Kapellmeister of St Stephen's. A gifted pupil, he was then sent to Naples in 1726 where he studied church music under Francesco Durante and opera under Leonardo Leo. He moved back to Vienna in 1736, becoming a court composer there, and working as Kapellmeister to the Prince of Saxe-Hildburghausen in the 1750s and 1760s. In 1774, Bonno was made Imperial court conductor to Joseph II, following the death of Florian Leopold Gassman. He died in Vienna.

While Bonno's music is rarely heard today, he was a prominent figure in the Viennese musical life of his time and his works were often performed. He worked with two main librettists: Giovanni Claudio Pasquini and Metastasio. The latter was Bonno's contemporary in Vienna, and the composer wrote the first music for Metastasio's Il natale di Giove (also set by Hasse), Il vero omaggio, Il re pastore (later set by Hasse and Mozart), L'eroe cinese (also set by Hasse), L'isola disabitata (also set by Haydn) and L'Atenaide ovvero Gli affetti più generosi.

Most of his output was for vocal forces, including stage works, oratorios, masses and other sacred pieces.

He is a silent supporting character in the play Amadeus written by Peter Shaffer. He is played by Patrick Hines in the film version Amadeus.

Works

Operas

Oratorios
 Eleazaro (1739)
 San Paolo in Athene (1740)
 Isacco figura del redentore (1759) – see  for Metastasio's libretto and settings by other composers
 Il Giuseppe riconosciuto (1774) – see  for Metastasio's libretto and settings by other composers

Notes

Sources

Operaglass List of Opera Composers
Angermüller, Rudolph (1992), 'Bonno, Giuseppe' in The New Grove Dictionary of Opera, ed. Stanley Sadie (London)

Further reading
 Karin Breitner: Giuseppe Bonno und sein Oratorienwerk. Vienna 1961, (University of Vienna, phil. Diss. 1961).
 Daniel Heartz: Haydn, Mozart and the Viennese School 1740–1780. Norton, New York 1995, pp. 115–120.
 S. Kleindienst: "Marginalien zu Giuseppe Bonnos Requiem". In: Roswitha Vera Karpf (ed.): Musik am Hof Maria Theresias. In memoriam Vera Schwarz. Katzbichler, Munich 1984, (Beiträge zur Aufführungspraxis 6), pp. 131–140.
 Raoul Meloncelli: "Un operista italiano alla corte di Vienna: Giuseppe Bonno (1710–1788)". In: Chigiana 29/30, 1975, pp. 331–342.
 Erich Schenk (1955), "Bonno, Giuseppe". Neue Deutsche Biographie, 2, Berlin: Duncker & Humblot, p. 448
 Alfred Schienerl: Die kirchlichen Kompositionen des Giuseppe Bonno. Vienna 1925, (University of Vienna, phil. Diss. 1925), (partially published in: Studien zur Musikwissenschaft 15, 1928, p. 62).
 Egon Wellesz: Giuseppe Bonno (1710–1788). Sein Leben und seine dramatischen Werke. In: Sammelbände der Internationalen Musik-Gesellschaft 11, 1909/1911, pp. 395–442.

1711 births
1788 deaths
Musicians from Vienna
Austrian Baroque composers
Austrian Classical-period composers
18th-century classical composers
18th-century Austrian male musicians
Austrian male classical composers
Austrian people of Italian descent